is a Japanese manga series written and illustrated by Tomohiro Hasegawa. It was serialized in Shueisha's Weekly Shōnen Jump from April 2020 to January 2021.

Plot
Third-year elementary school student Shota Aikawa's pet Japanese rhinoceros beetle, named Moriking, finally metamorphoses into an adult, but for some strange reason he looks like a male human. Aside from the horn on his head and wings on his back, he looks perfectly human but maintains his beetle traits, like walking on walls and flying. As an Insect King, which are said to be born once every one hundred million years, Moriking announces that he is destined to be  and rule over all insects. To prove their worth would-be kings must leave their homes and survive in the world beyond, this is how Moriking came into Shota's possession and becomes a member of the Aikawa family. However, he is but one of five insects competing to become King of the Forest.

Publication
Moriking is written and illustrated by Tomohiro Hasegawa. It was serialized in Shueisha's Weekly Shōnen Jump from April 13, 2020 to January 18, 2021.<ref name="3-new-manga"></p></ref><ref></p></ref> Shueisha has collected its chapters into individual tankōbon volumes. The first volume was released on August 4, 2020. As of October 2, 2020, two volumes have been released.

In North America, the series is digitally published in English by Viz Media and by Shueisha on their Manga Plus website and application. Viz Media also started publishing the volumes digitally on May 25, 2021.

Volume list

Reception
Chris Beveridge of The Fandom Post stated that Moriking is accessible enough for general readers and "just weird enough to skew in a fun direction." He praised Hasegawa's designs, flow and direction, and backgrounds. Beveridge said that despite having many of the familiar 1980s manga trappings, Moriking uses them in a different way. He wrote that while the series is not high-art, it is a fun title that is easy to pickup and keep up with because of its quirkiness. Beveridge felt that Hasegawa was able to end the series on his own terms. He reflected that the manga unfolded in a way that reminded him of Rumiko Takahashi's early works, and despite turning into a tournament series, was still spaced out in a way that kept the character material fun. He ended by calling Moriking "a fun and enjoyable romp with good artwork, [some] nice twists and details to it, and enjoyable humor."

Notes

References

External links
 

Adventure anime and manga
Comedy anime and manga
Fantasy anime and manga
Shōnen manga
Shueisha manga
Viz Media manga